Caliber persistent artery is a common vascular anomaly where a main arterial branch extends into superficial tissues without a reduction of diameter. This is more likely to be present in elderly people. They may occur on the mucosa of the lips, or elsewhere. It commonly presents as an elevated soft tissue mass and is often pulsatile on manual palpation. Clinical questioning is important, given the risk of bleeding, either from slight trauma or accident, lack of awareness could possibly lead to an incorrect diagnosis.

References

Vascular-related cutaneous conditions